Pertusaria flavida is a species of crustose lichen in the family Pertusariaceae. It was first formally described as a new species by Augustin Pyramus de Candolle in 1815 as Variolaria flavida. Jack Laundon transferred it to the genus Pertusaria in 1963.

References

flavida
Lichen species
Lichens described in 1815
Lichens of Europe
Lichens of North America
Taxa named by Augustin Pyramus de Candolle